DWBQ (106.3 FM), broadcasting as 106.3 Energy FM, is a radio station owned and operated by Ultrasonic Broadcasting System. The station's studio is located at 3/F Traders Square Bldg., P. Burgos St., Naga, Camarines Sur.

References

Radio stations in Naga, Camarines Sur
Radio stations established in 1999